Dewangiri was a northern part of Kamrup, measuring , which was ceded to Bhutan in 1951. The area contains ruins of ancient temples and loose structures. In modern times it lost its earlier importance. It was used only for winter grazing of Bhutanese animals for an annual fee to India before it was ceded to Bhutan.

See also
Western Assam

References

Kamrup region